Little Men is a Canadian television show that first aired on November 7, 1998 on the PAX TV network and was shown in Canada on CTV beginning January 1, 1999.  The show is set as a continuation of the Louisa May Alcott novel Little Men (1871), a follow-up to Little Women (1868).  Due to low ratings, the show was cancelled after 2 seasons, with the final episode aired on December 17, 1999.

Synopsis 
The show opens in Concord, Massachusetts, one month after the death of Jo's husband, Fritz Bhaer.  Josephine Bhaer (Michelle Rene Thomas) must take over the Plumfield School, a school in the barn on the Bhaer property, once taught by her husband.  As she tries to adjust to the pressures to find a new teacher, a merchant mariner Nick Riley (Spencer Rochfort) enters the scene to act as a caretaker of the school.  Franz (Robin Dunne), Jo's nephew, must take over  teaching the class of young teens, notably Dan (Corey Sevier), Nat (Trevor Blumas), Emil (Alex Cambell), Nan (Brittney Irvin) and Bess (Rachel Skarsten).  The show follows the children's adventures at Plumfield, as well as the blossoming relationship between Jo and Nick.  Appearances by the other living March sisters, Meg (Jennifer Wigmore) and Amy (Amy Price-Francis) ground the plot as another chapter in the continuing saga of the March girls of Little Women. Jo's young son, Rob Bhaer, is portrayed by Munro Chambers and his brother Thomas.

Characters

Plumfield residents
Josephine "Jo" Bhaer (Michelle Rene Thomas): One of the eponymous Little Woman, Jo is now a young widow following the death of her husband Fritz. She vows to keep her husband's school open, though many feel that she should close it down. She has one son, Rob. Jo often reminisces about her childhood with her sisters, Meg, Amy, and the late Beth. She remains close to her living relatives who continue to support her.
Nicolas "Nick" Riley (Spencer Rochfort): A merchant marine who comes to work at Plumfield. After he is arrested for assaulting Emil's uncle, Jo arranges for him to serve his sentence at Plumfield. He later decides to stay on permanently as the school's caretaker. Nick had a rough childhood after his parents died in an influenza epidemic when he was twelve. He stayed with his uncle who was abusive towards his wife. At fifteen, he went on his first sea voyage. In "Philanthropy", Nick reveals that he cannot read and Jo begins teaching him.
Dan Maddison (Corey Sevier): A sponsored student who was once homeless living on the streets of Boston. He survived by partnering with Jasper (Jason McSkimming) and later Nat. In "Tough Crimes", Jasper comes to Plumfield to take Dan to California. Dan soon learns that his friend is an irredeemable criminal and remains at school.
Nathaniel "Nat" Blake (Trevor Blumas): Dan's best friend. Like Dan, he is a sponsored student. They were homeless together in Boston. Nat tends to be cautious and nervous, though he is capable of great acts of bravery in times of need.
Anthea "Nan" Harding (Britt Irvin): Jo's first female student. After her mother's death, Nan was unhappy and often ran away from home, which lead her father to send her to Plumfield. A tomboy, she does not get along with the prim and proper Bess at first. They eventually become friends.
Elizabeth "Bess" Laurence (Rachel Skarsten): Amy and Laurie's only child. Her mother has molded her into an elegant and refined young lady, but her father worries that she has no spirit from spending too much time indoors and not enjoying life.
Emil Hoffman (Alex Campbell): A student at Plumfield who hopes to be a sailor someday. His uncle pulls him out of Plumfield against Emil's wishes. He returns after his uncle beats him when he refuses to go to military school.
Asia (Sandra Caldwell): The resident housekeeper of Plumfield who handles most of the cooking. She is firm but kind with the students. In return, they respect her advice and admonishments.
Franz Bhaer (Robin Dunne): Jo and Fritz's nephew. He starts teaching at Plumfield after his uncle's death. Franz is accepted into Harvard, but delays his enrollment until Plumfield can obtain another teacher. In "Tough Crimes", he decides to remain the school's permanent teacher.
Thomas "Tommy" Bangs (Matt Robinson): A student at Plumfield. Tommy occasionally gets into minor scrapes such as in "Philanthropy".
Rob Bhaer (Munro Chambers/Thomas Chambers): Jo's young son with her late husband.
Jack Ford (Dov Tiefenbach)

Recurring
Margaret "Meg" Brooke (Jennifer Wigmore): Jo's sister who supports her emotionally after Fritz's death. She mourns the death of her own husband, John, who died some years previously. Meg is also the mother of twins.
Amy Laurence (Amy Price-Francis: Jo's sister with whom she is sometimes at odds. In "Thanksgiving", Amy returns to America with her husband Laurie and daughter Bess. She sends Bess to Jo's school, though she is opposed to it at first.
Theodore "Laurie" Laurence (Dan Chameroy): Amy's husband and father of Bess. He worries that Bess has no spirit and sends her to his sister-in-law's school in "Thanksgiving". Laurie is always there to help Jo and her school, including sending a library in "Philanthropy".
Isaac (Michael Oliphant): An African-American boy who used to be a slave in Georgia with his parents Ruth (Arlene Duncan) and Josiah (Desmond Campbell). Jo helps the family settle in Concord and takes Isaac on as a student.

Episodes

Season 1 (1998–99)

Season 2 (1999)

Production
The series was filmed in Pickering, Ontario, at the Claremont Conservation Area. The series was a joint production between Alliance Atlantis Communications and Paxson Communications. Filming of the first season took place between August 1998 and January 1999. The second season was filmed from April through October 1999.

International distribution 
While being a Canadian production, Little Men premiered in the United States on PAX TV in November 1998. Showtime Family Zone reran the series in 2003. The show's domestic premiere was January 1, 1999 on CTV. The series was also shown in Switzerland, starting July 31, 2000, where it was known as "L'école du bonheur", in France, starting December 25, 2001, and in India, where it ran on Hallmark Channel.

Home video releases 
The series has a total of 26 episodes. Region 1 DVDs of the series distributed by BFS Entertainment in 4 episode installments. BFS has only released the first eight episodes from season one.  Episodes 1-4 were also released on VHS by BFS. There is also a Region 4 DVD release from Madmen Entertainment.

References

External links 

 

1998 Canadian television series debuts
1999 Canadian television series endings
1990s Canadian drama television series
1990s school television series
Television series about Christianity
CTV Television Network original programming
PAX TV original programming
Television shows based on American novels
Television series about families
Television series about orphans
English-language television shows
Canadian religious television series
Television shows set in Massachusetts
Works based on Little Women
Little Men